Andriy Vitaliyovych Stryzhak (born 22 October 1999) is a Ukrainian professional footballer who plays as a midfielder for Gabala.

Career

Early years
Stryzhak is a product of Dynamo Kyiv academy.

Arsenal Kyiv
He made his debut in the Ukrainian Premier League while playing for Arsenal Kyiv in a losing home game against Lviv on 22 July 2018.

Gabala
On 10 August 2022, Gabala announced the signing of Stryzhak.

References

External links
 
 
 

1999 births
Living people
People from Novovolynsk
Ukrainian footballers
Association football midfielders
FC Arsenal Kyiv players
Ukrainian Premier League players
Ukrainian First League players
Ukrainian Second League players
FC Shakhtar Donetsk players
FC Vorskla Poltava players
FC Chornomorets Odesa players
FC Hirnyk-Sport Horishni Plavni players
FC Metalist Kharkiv players
FC Olimpik Donetsk players
NK Međimurje players
Sportspeople from Volyn Oblast
Ukrainian expatriate footballers
Expatriate footballers in Croatia
Ukrainian expatriate sportspeople in Croatia
Expatriate footballers in Azerbaijan
Ukrainian expatriate sportspeople in Azerbaijan